Polygon Sweet Nice was an Indonesian and Irish-registered UCI Continental cycling team that was founded in 2006 and disbanded in 2013.

For the 2013 season the team rejoined the UCI Continental ranks after being an amateur team for the previous three seasons.

2013 team roster

Major wins
2008
 Stage 1 Tour de Indonesia, Artem Timofeev
2009
 Stage 2 Perlis Open, Herwin Wijaya
 Stage 1 Tour de East Java, Sergey Kudentsov
 Stages 3 & 8 Tour de Indonesia, Sergey Kudentsov
2013
 Stage 1 Tour de Singkarak, Óscar Pujol

References

UCI Continental Teams (Europe)
Cycling teams established in 2006
Cycling teams disestablished in 2013
Cycling teams based in Ireland
Defunct cycling teams based in Ireland
Cycling teams based in Indonesia
2006 establishments in Indonesia
2013 disestablishments in Ireland
UCI Continental Teams (Asia)